Frazzanò is a comune (municipality) in the Metropolitan City of Messina in the Italian region Sicily, located about  east of Palermo and about  west of Messina.

Frazzanò borders the following municipalities: Capri Leone, Galati Mamertino, Longi, Mirto, San Marco d'Alunzio, San Salvatore di Fitalia.

References

Cities and towns in Sicily